Lis is a surname from the Polish word for a fox. Notable people with the name include:
Andrzej Lis (born 1959), Polish fencer
Bogdan Lis (born 1952), Polish politician
Hanna Lis (born 1970), Polish TV journalist
Iryna Lis (born 1972), Belarusian dressage rider
Joe Lis (1946–2010), American baseball player
John T. Lis, American professor
Lucjan Lis (1950–2015), Polish cyclist
Oliver Lis (born 1984), Colombian writer
Tomasz Lis (born 1966), Polish journalist and former TV anchor

See also
Lis (given name)

Polish-language surnames
Surnames from nicknames